Barboides is a genus of very small ray-finned fish in the family Cyprinidae from freshwater habitats in West and Middle Africa.

Species
Barboides britzi Conway & Moritz, 2006
Barboides gracilis Brüning, 1929

References

 

 
Barbs (fish)